Matrikula is a 2009 album and his 4th album by Filipino rapper Gloc-9. It has 16 tracks and was released under Musiko Records & Sony Music Philippines.

Track listing

Singles

Upuan
Upuan is the first single of Gloc-9 off the album. The song features Jeazel Grutas of the band Zelle.

Balita
Balita is the second single of Gloc-9. It features Gabby Alipe of Urbandub.

Martilyo
Martilyo is the third single of Gloc-9 of the album.

Album credits
Executive producer: Rudy Y. Tee
A&R Executive: Vic Valenciano
Marketing directors: Narciso Chan, Mario Joson
Photography and art direction: J. Pacena II
Assistant photographer: Mary Ann Sy
Stylists: David Baky Jr.(for Thea, Shaun and Daniel Pollisco's wardrobe for Matrikula Album and Jeazell Grutas and Gloc-9's wardrobe for Upuan music video), Kel Sampayan (for Matrkula Album Cover and Gloc-9's Matrikula wardrobe)
Make-up artist: Em Rejano

External links
Flip Clan
Sony Music Philippines
https://web.archive.org/web/20110714131702/http://iamsogno.multiply.com/photos/album/78/Matrikula_by_Gloc-9_2009
http://sites.google.com/site/jonathanladramusic/the-i10---november-7-2009
https://web.archive.org/web/20091120011422/http://www.myxph.com/tabid/363/MYXCharts.aspx

Gloc-9 albums
2009 albums